The Krewe of Muses is an all-female super krewe and social organization.

History and formation
The Muses were founded in 2000 by Staci Rosenberg and first paraded during Mardi Gras in 2001. Since then the krewe has grown to include approximately 1100 members. The krewe's parade is held on the Thursday evening before Mardi Gras, and features 25 floats designed by Kern Studios.

Parade 
Krewe of Muses parade on Jeudi Gras, the Thursday night prior to Mardi Gras. The parade starts at Magazine Street and Jefferson street in Uptown New Orleans; proceeds east to Napoleon street where it follows Knights of Babylon and Knights of Chaos.

Parade themes 
Krewe of Muses season parade theme is secret until Jeudi Gras. The theme is always satirical.

In 2006, to honor the victims of Hurricane Katrina, the Muses had at the tail end of their parade an empty float which evoked the riderless horse that follows the caisson carrying the casket in a funeral procession.

Honorary Muses 
Krewe of Muses select one woman to be Honorary Muse each parade season. Each year's Honorary Muse rides in the krewe's main float, a large fiber optic high heeled shoe.

Iconic floats 

The Goddessey is the first float in the parade and carries the krewe captain and officers. Muses krewe member Susan Gisleson designed “The Goddessey.” Built by Kerns Studios, it features Greek mythology’s winged stallion, Pegasus; symbols for the nine muses in Greek mythology; and more than 100 peach-colored lanterns hanging from the Tree of Knowledge.
High Heel Shoe carries the Honorary Muse of the Parade
Mama Duck and Duckies
The Sirens is the final float in the parade.

Throws
Trinkets, collectables, masks, and beads tossed by hand from riders of the floats are called throws. Collectible throws from Muses include the Muses emblem beads, stuffed animals, signature beads, light-up medallion beads, custom print go-cups, rubber ducks. A plush Pegasus is thrown from the Goddessey.

Krewe of Muses is known for their hand decorated shoes, their signature throw.

Other activities 
The Krewe of Muses has presented several award-winning displays.

In addition to their parade and year-long philanthropic works, the Muses host a design contest for students in the area. The winner has his or her design turned into a throw cup.

Depictions in media 
The Sirens float appears in the music video for Arcade Fire's Electric Blue. 
The Krewe of Muses parade is featured in the opening sequence in HBO's Treme season 2, episode 7 "Carnival Time".

References

External links 

Krewe of Muses website

Mardi Gras in New Orleans
Organizations established in 2000
Women's clubs in the United States
Women in Louisiana